Gregory de Polnay (born 17 October 1943) is an English-born actor, director and voice teacher who is noted for his work on stage, radio and television.

Career
Born in London, in 1943, the son of Peter de Polnay and Margaret Mitchell Banks, he was probably best remembered for his role as Det. Sgt. Mike Brewer in Dixon of Dock Green, de Polnay was also a regular in the Australian sitcom series, The Group (1971).

De Polnay's credits include: Space: 1999, Doctor Who (the serial The Robots of Death), Poldark, Enemy at the Door, Tenko, The Fourth Arm, One by One, Howards' Way and Boon.

De Polnay has been an actor, director and voice teacher for nearly forty years, working in all aspects of the theatre with several West End credits to his name and appearing with the RSC in his own production of You Can't Shut Out The Human Voice featuring Peggy Ashcroft and Ben Kingsley. He also has over 100 TV appearances and 350 radio broadcasts to his name.

Due to an accident sustained while playing Malvolio in Twelfth Night at the Colorado Shakespeare Festival, the USA in 1987, de Polnay retrained as a voice specialist at the Royal Central School of Speech and Drama, where he gained the Advanced Diploma in Voice Studies and later on an MA at King's College London in Text and Performance Studies. Whilst being Head of Voice at the Drama Centre, London and at LAMDA, he has been a prominent member of staff at several major drama schools and has lectured on 'Language and Style' in the USA, Canada and South Africa.

During the past decade, de Polnay has directed twenty-one Jacobean and Restoration plays for RADA. He was a drama advisor for the BBC World Service Classical Drama Series and has adapted several plays for the BBC World Service. When not directing, de Polnay works for several organizations in the field of public speaking and communication skills, including his own business GdeP Associates Ltd in London. He coaches several top TV and sports presenters. de Polnay also works extensively for RADA in Business providing communication and presentation skills training for a wide variety of business organizations. He has been appointed Director of the RADA Shakespeare Certificate Scheme.

References

External links 
 
Greg de Polnay | GdeP Associates Ltd.
Gregory de Polnay at Theatricalia

1943 births
Alumni of King's College London
Alumni of the Royal Central School of Speech and Drama
English male television actors
Living people
Male actors from London